This Is Your Time may refer to:

 This Is Your Time (Michael W. Smith album), 1999
 This Is Your Time (Change album), 1983